The Good Boy is a 2016 Russian comedy film directed by Oksana Karas. The picture won the Grand Prix of the 27th Kinotavr. It was released on November 10, 2016.

Plot
The film depicts six days from the life of ninth-grader Kolya Smirnov (Semyon Treskunov).

Kolya falls in love with his teacher (Ieva Andreevajte). Someone sets fire to the school's additional building which contained the new computers, the principal's daughter, high school student Ksyusha (Anastasia Bogatyryova), in turn falls in love with Kolya and is under the impression that Kolya was the one who set the school on fire.

Kolya's father Alexander (Konstantin Khabensky) makes the family transition to the 12/36 system – this means twelve hours for sleep and thirty-six hours for staying awake, which does not allow the protagonist to sleep or even to collect thoughts.

Cast
Semyon Treskunov – Kolya Smirnov
Mikhail Yefremov – Vladimir Dronov
Konstantin Khabensky – Alexander Smirnov
Anastasia Bogatyryova – Ksysha Dronova
Ieva Andreevajte – Alisa Denisovna
Aleksandr Pal — Stanislav Ilyich

Production
Semyon Treskunov auditioned for the film The Good Boy for the first time when he was 11, and this was the third casting in his life. At that time he was too young for this role. Because of problems with financing, the launching of the preparatory period was repeatedly postponed and by the time investors appeared Treskunov had grown to the age required by the scenario.

References

External links

Official website

Walt Disney Pictures films
Russian teen comedy films
2010s coming-of-age comedy films
2010s teen comedy films
2010s high school films
Russian coming-of-age comedy films
2016 comedy films
Films produced by Fyodor Bondarchuk